The term dog days refers to the hottest and most humid time of the year in the Northern Hemisphere.

Dog Days may also refer to:

Arts, entertainment, and media

Films 
 Dog Days (1925 film), an Our Gang short film
 Dog Days (1970 film), a Swedish dark comedy
 Dog Day (film), a 1984 crime-drama starring Lee Marvin
 Dog Days (2001 film), an Austrian feature film directed by Ulrich Seidl
 Dog Days (2018 film), an American comedy film
 Dog Days of Summer (film), a 2007 American independent feature film
 Diary of a Wimpy Kid: Dog Days (film), a 2012 film

Television
 Dog Days (Japanese TV series), released in 2011
 Dog Days (U.S. TV series), a 2002 American series
 "Dog Days", an episode of the sitcom The King of Queens

Literature 
 A Dog Day: or the Angel in the House, a 1902 children's book written by Walter Emanuel and illustrated by Cecil Aldin
 Dog Days, a 1998 novel by Daniel Lyons
 Dog Days, a 2006 novel by Ana Marie Cox
 Diary of a Wimpy Kid: Dog Days (book), a 2009 novel by Jeff Kinney

Music 
 Dog Day (band), a Canadian indie rock band
 Dog Days (Atlanta Rhythm Section album), released in 1975
 Dog Days (Blue Mountain album), released in 1995
 Dog Days (EP), released in 2000 by Goatsnake
 "Dog Days" (song), released in 2008 by Florence and the Machine

Other arts, entertainment, and media
 Dog Days (opera) 
 Kane & Lynch 2: Dog Days, a 2010 video game

Other uses 
 Dog day cicada

See also
 Day of the Dogs, a 2005 novel by Andrew Cartmel